The Men's Cathay Pacific Hong Kong Open 2014 is the men's edition of the 2014 Hong Kong Open, which is a PSA World Series event Platinum (prize money: $150,000). The event took place in Hong Kong from 26 August to 31 August. Mohamed El Shorbagy won his first Hong Kong Open trophy, beating Grégory Gaultier in the final.

Prize money and ranking points
For 2013, the prize purse was $150,000. The prize money and points breakdown is as follows:

Seeds

Draw and results

See also
Hong Kong Open (squash)
Women's Hong Kong squash Open 2014
2014 Men's World Open Squash Championship
PSA World Series 2014

References

Squash tournaments in Hong Kong
Men's Hong Kong Open (squash)
Men's Hong Kong Open (squash)